CIHT-FM (89.9 FM, Hot 89.9) is a radio station licensed to Ottawa, Ontario, Canada. Owned by Stingray Group, it broadcasts a CHR/Top 40 format. CIHT's studios are located on Antares Drive in Nepean, while its transmitter is located in Camp Fortune, Quebec.

History
The station was licensed by the CRTC in 2001 to broadcast a rhythmic CHR/dance format known as The Planet 89.9. The station launched on February 7, 2003 as The New Hot 89.9 under a rhythmic contemporary format, but flipped to its current format after 105.3 Kiss FM signed on the air in 2004. Both CIHT and CHBN-FM in Edmonton share the distinction of having been shifted from rhythmic top 40 to top 40 in less than a year after their 2003 sign-ons.

Ottawa was the largest market Newcap owned radio stations until its expansion into Toronto and Vancouver in 2014, thanks to the purchase of five stations from a blind trust being run by Bell Media as part of their merger with Astral Media. Even while they were the only English top 40 station in Ottawa, it is one of the few top 40 stations in Canada to continue supporting older music, making CIHT lean towards more of a hot adult contemporary direction than most top 40 stations in Canada, but on March 31, 2014, CIHT picked up new competition with CKQB-FM's flip from active rock to a rhythmic-leaning CHR format, a move that prompted CIHT to back off from the Hot AC fare and become more hit-driven with more currents.

The station produces the Stingray Hit List Countdown (formerly the Canadian Hit 40 and the Canadian Hit 30), a weekly countdown show that is syndicated to other Stingray sister stations.

References

External links
 Hot 89.9
 
 

Iht
Iht
Iht
Radio stations established in 2003
2003 establishments in Ontario